The United Football League FA League Cup, commonly known as UFL FA League Cup, was a Filipino association football competition. It was played on a multistage format that culminates in a knockout stage (single elimination). Clubs that were eligible to compete for the cup were those who then played in the United Football League's two divisions. The only edition of this tournament was part of the 2014–15 United Football League season, preceding the league proper and the ULF Cup, the pre-existing and separate cup tournament.

2014 edition

The 2014 United Football League FA League Cup was the first and only edition of the tournament. The competition started on September 20 and ended on November 6, 2014.

Competition format
The 14 clubs were separated into two groups of seven, where the top four advanced to the quarterfinals. Separate draws took place before the quarterfinals and semi-finals to determine which clubs will face off.

Group stage

All times are Philippine Standard Time (PST) – UTC+8.

Group A

Group B

Knockout stage

Quarter-finals
In the quarter-finals stage, matchups were made via random draw.  They will play against one another in a single leg knockout basis. The draw for the quarter-finals round was held on October 23, 2014. After the quarterfinals, another random draw will determine semifinal pairings.

Semi-finals

Third-place playoff

Final

Top goalscorers

Correct as of 11:30, November 6, 2014

Awards
The following were the competition’s top individual awardees.

Golden Gloves:  Patrick Deyto (Global)
Golden Boot:  Louis Max Clark (Kaya)
Golden Ball:  Jin Ho Kim (Ceres)

References

External links
 

United Football League (Philippines)
Defunct football competitions in the Philippines
2014 establishments in the Philippines
National association football league cups
2014 disestablishments in the Philippines
Cup
United Football League Cup seasons